Circulatory System is the first album by the American music ensemble Circulatory System. It was released on August 28, 2001, on musician John Fernandes' Cloud Recordings label.

The album artwork is a juxtaposition of the album covers for Music from the Unrealized Film Script: Dusk at Cubist Castle and Black Foliage: Animation Music Volume One by Elephant 6 act The Olivia Tremor Control, who shared members with Circulatory System.

Critical reception 

Pitchfork named Circulatory System the fifth best album of 2001.

Track listing

Personnel
Will Cullen Hart – vocals, guitar, electronics
John Fernandes – clarinet, violin, bass guitar
Peter Erchick – organ, bass guitar, vocals
Heather McIntosh – cello, bass guitar, vocals
Derek Almstead – drums, percussion, vocals
AJ Griffin – guitar, vocals

Former members
Hannah M. Jones – drums, percussion

References

Circulatory System (band) albums
2001 debut albums